Twice 22 is a collection of short stories by American writer Ray Bradbury.  The book, published in 1966, is an omnibus edition of The Golden Apples of the Sun and A Medicine for Melancholy.  It is titled Twice 22 on the book's dustjacket and spine, but titled Twice Twenty-two on the book's title page.

Contents
 The Golden Apples of the Sun
 "The Fog Horn"
 "The Pedestrian"
 "The April Witch"
 "The Wilderness"
 "The Fruit at the Bottom of the Bowl"
 "Invisible Boy"
 "The Flying Machine"
 "The Murderer"
 "The Golden Kite, The Silver Wind"
 "I See You Never"
 "Embroidery"
 "The Big Black and White Game"
 "A Sound of Thunder"
 "The Great Wide World Over There"
 "Powerhouse"
 "En La Noche"
 "Sun and Shadow"
 "The Meadow"
 "The Garbage Collector"
 "The Great Fire"
 "Hail and Farewell"
 "The Golden Apples of the Sun"
A Medicine for Melancholy
 "In a Season of Calm Weather"
 "The Dragon"
 "A Medicine for Melancholy"
 "The End of the Beginning"
 "The Wonderful Ice Cream Suit"
 "Fever Dream"
 "The Marriage Mender"
 "The Town Where No One Got Off"
 "A Scent of Sarsaparilla"
 "Icarus Montgolfier Wright"
 "The Headpiece"
 "Dark They Were, and Golden-Eyed"
 "The Smile"
 "The First Night of Lent"
 "The Time of Going Away"
 "All Summer in a Day"
 "The Gift"
 "The Great Collision of Monday Last"
 "The Little Mice"
 "The Shoreline at Sunset"
 "The Strawberry Window"
 "The Day It Rained Forever"

References

Footnotes

Bibliography

External links
 
 

1966 short story collections
Short story collections by Ray Bradbury
Doubleday (publisher) books